Newhalen is a city in Lake and Peninsula Borough, Alaska, United States. At the 2020 census, the population was 168.

Geography
Newhalen is located at  (59.725688, -154.894442).

Newhalen is on the north shore of Iliamna Lake in southern Alaska, at the mouth of Newhalen River.

The proposed Pebble Mine site is located near Newhalen.

The nearest mountain is called Roadhouse Mountain.

Demographics

As of the census of 2000, there were 160 people, 39 households, and 37 families residing in the city. There were 51 housing units at an average density of 8.4 per square mile (3.3/km2). The racial makeup of the city was 8.75% White, 85.00% Native American, and 6.25% from two or more races.

There were 39 households, out of which 59.0% had children under the age of 18 living with them, 56.4% were married couples living together, 12.8% had a female householder with no husband present, and 5.1% were non-families. 5.1% of all households were made up of individuals, and 0.0% consisted of a sole occupant 65 years of age or older. The average household size was 4.10 and the average family size was 4.22.

In the city, the age distribution of the population shows 45.0% under the age of 18, 9.4% from 18 to 24, 20.6% from 25 to 44, 20.0% from 45 to 64, and 5.0% who were 65 years of age or older. The median age was 20 years. For every 100 females, there were 100.0 males. For every 100 females age 18 and over, there were 120.0 males.

The median income for a household in the city was $36,250, and the median income for a family was $35,000. Males had a median income of $38,333 versus $23,750 for females. The per capita income for the city was $9,448. About 26.7% of families and 16.3% of the population were below the poverty line, including 17.9% of those under the age of eighteen and none of those 65 or over.

History
Newhalen was originally a Yup'ik village called Noghelin, after the Newhalen River. "Newhalen" is an Anglicized version of the original name. The village was established in the late 1800s because of the bountiful fish and game in the area.

The population of Newhalen now includes Alutiiqs and Athabascans as well as Yupik. Most pursue subsistence hunting and fishing.

References

Cities in Lake and Peninsula Borough, Alaska
Cities in Alaska